Carlo Varetto (26 May 1905 – 10 January 1986) was an Italian shooter who competed at the 1936 and 1956 Olympics in 50 m rifle events. His son Sergio became an Olympic pistol shooter.

Carlo Varetto was born to Aldo Varetto (1879–1959), a keen pistol and rifle shooter who often competed alongside his son and then grandson. Carlo had an early and unsuccessful marriage, after which he remarried Annita Romagnoli a few years before the outbreak of World War II; their son Sergio was born in 1937. In the 1920s Carlo became one of the best Italian rifle shooters, which he demonstrated at an international competition in Turin in 1927. Between 1935 and 1958 he won at least 10 Italian Championships of the Armed Forces and was included into the national team for the 1936 and 1956 Olympics. He died in 1986 in Vergato.

References

External links
 

1905 births
1986 deaths
Italian male sport shooters
Olympic shooters of Italy
Shooters at the 1936 Summer Olympics
Shooters at the 1956 Summer Olympics